Mamuni Mayan is a character in Tamil mythology. He is featured in works of Sangam literature such as the Cilappatikaram, Manimekalai, and Civaka Cintamani, identified with the asura Mayasura of the Hindu epic Mahabharata. The character is regarded to be the mythical founder of the Vastu Shastra.

In Tamil tradition, Mayan is credited with the authorship of  the Mayamata Vastu Shastra as well as the Aintiram (Aindra, a school of grammar connected with the Tolkappiyam). He is also is credited with the authorship of the Surya Siddhanta.

See also
Mayasura
Kubera
Vishvakarma

References

Asura
Tamil mythical figures